Robert Aldridge (1544 – 1616) was an English clergyman.

Life
Born at Burnham in Buckinghamshire in 1544, Robert Aldridge was educated at Eton and King's College, Cambridge, where he was a Fellow from 1564 to 1567. From 1576 to 1616 he was Rector of Wollaton 1576–1616, and from 1 May 1578 to 1616 Vicar of St Mary's Church, Nottingham. He was the last Vicar of St Mary's Nottingham to have the Crown as patron until 1973. It was in 1598, during the incumbency of Robert Aldridge, that the Crown sold the patronage of St Mary's to Sir Henry Pierrepont.

On 26 July 1592, Thomas Clerke, of Nottingham, faced a charge in the Archdeaconry court,  And then the judge, accepting this confession, as he was and is bound, pronounced the said Clerke to have ipso facto incurred the sentence of excommunication by virtue of the statue in that case provided. Then Mr Gymney, by virtue of order of the judge, absolved the said Thomas Clarke from the sentence of excommunication pronounced on account of his contempt of court.

John Darrell, of Queens' College, Cambridge, was appointed by Robert Aldridge as curate. Darrell already had a reputation for being involved in cases of exorcism. Before long, he was involved again, this time in the case of William Sommers, who suffered from fits, or, as Darrell claimed, demonic possession. Darrell was accused of fraudulent exorcism and removed from his position by John Whitgift, Archbishop of Canterbury.

From the archdeaconry court records for 2 August 1606, William Little Feere and Marmaduke Gregorie, churchwardens of St Mary's Church, Nottingham were warned to see that the church of St. Mary, Nottingham was duly decorated in due form with the sentences of the Holy Scriptures before Michaelmas.

The churchwardens were also under pressure to repair the chancel, damaged by a storm in 1588. The repairs seem to still be outstanding as late as 1632. There are frequent entries in the Archdeaconry Records and include charges against the Vicar.

From the Churchwardens' Presentment Bills for April 21, 1612. St. Maries in Nott. 

On the same day in the Archdeaconry Court, a licence was granted to John Sherot to read prayers in St. Mary, Nottingham and to teach children the alphabet.

The Register shows that Robert Aldridge was buried in the church, but his memorial has perished.

References

Muriel Clara Bradbrook, Shakespeare: the poet in his world, Taylor & Francis, 1980, p. 195
Benjamin Brook, The lives of the Puritans: containing a biographical account of those divines who distinguished themselves in the cause of religious liberty, from the reformation under Queen Elizabeth, to the Act of uniformity in 1662, Volume 2, J. Black, 1813, pp. 117–122

16th-century births
1616 deaths
Vicars of St Mary's Church, Nottingham
People educated at Eton College
Fellows of King's College, Cambridge
16th-century English Anglican priests
17th-century English Anglican priests
People from Burnham, Buckinghamshire
1544 births